Roberto Fronza (born 10 July 1984), also known as Beto, is a former Brazilian professional footballer who played as a centre back. He currently serves as an assistant coach for Hong Kong Premier League club Southern.

Club career

Pegasus 
Beto scored the first goal in Pegasus' 2008–09 Senior Shield Final win over Sun Hei. Pegasus went on to win 3–0 to claim their first ever trophy.

Tuen Mun 
On 4 January 2012, Tuen Mun announced the signing of Beto on loan from Rangers. In August 2012, Beto signed a permanent contract with Tuen Mun SA.

Eastern 
On 11 June 2013, Eastern announced that Beto has joined the club for free.

Southern 
Beto joined Southern in 2016. His contract was renewed in July 2017.

On 7 June 2018, Beto signed a new contract with Southern for the following season.

On 1 June 2019, Southern announced that Beto's contract would be renewed for the 2019–20 season.

Managerial career
On 21 June 2021, Beto announced his retirement from professional football to become an assistant coach for Southern. He is now the head coach of Southern.

Honours

Club 
Pegasus
 Hong Kong Senior Shield: 2008–09

Eastern
 Hong Kong FA Cup: 2013–14

References

External links
Roberto Fronza at HKFA

1984 births
Living people
Brazilian footballers
Association football defenders
Shek Kip Mei SA players
Expatriate footballers in Hong Kong
Hong Kong First Division League players
Hong Kong Premier League players
Brazilian expatriate sportspeople in Hong Kong
Eastern Sports Club footballers
Hong Kong Rangers FC players
Southern District FC players
Hong Kong League XI representative players